The Oracle is a large indoor shopping and leisure mall on the banks of the River Kennet in Reading, Berkshire, England. Partly on the site of a 17th-century workhouse of the same name, it was developed and is owned by a joint venture of Hammerson and the Abu Dhabi Investment Authority.

History
The Oracle takes its name from the 17th century Oracle workhouse built by funds from a local man John Kendrick. This once occupied a small part of the site now occupied by the shopping centre.

In 1997, the property developer Hammerson acquired a 22-acre site of largely derelict land immediately to the south of the town centre. Most of this site was previously occupied by Simonds Brewery (latterly owned by the Courage brewing company) and by the Reading Buses depot (formerly the Reading Corporation tram depot). The brewery had earlier relocated to a new site adjoining the M4 motorway, whilst the bus depot was relocated to a location just west of the town centre as one of the first phases of the redevelopment.

Hammerson's strategy was to create a combination of big-name retailers at the new centre, including a number of international retail banners fairly new to Britain. The merchandise mix has strong emphasis on fashion and is slightly higher-end than the average for Reading's main street shops. Peter Cole, the development director for Hammerson said "We were looking to bring in a retail mix that would enhance what was already there – we wanted to get the right caliber retailers to suit the slightly higher-end shopping demographic of the area."

The main shopping malls comprising phase I of The Oracle were opened in September 1999, followed in November by the Riverside restaurants, pubs and cinema that made up phase II. Once phase I was complete, the way was open to relocate the Debenhams department store from its previous location on Broad Street into the centre. This in turn allowed for the redevelopment of the old Debenhams site as phase III of The Oracle, linked to phase I by a bridge over Minster Street. Phase III provided The Oracle with a direct link to Broad Street, and was opened in May 2000 by The Princess Royal.

Stores and facilities

The centre contains 90 shops, including department stores from the Next plc and House of Fraser chains. A third and larger department store, John Lewis & Partners (formerly Heelas) is adjacent to the Minster Street entrance but not part of the centre itself. There are also 22 restaurants, cafés and bars along the riverside of the Kennet, and an 11-screen Vue cinema. The Oracle increases Reading's retail footage by one third, and it has attracted some retailers who would otherwise not have located in Reading.

The Oracle Riverside area, with its restaurants and bars, spans the Brewery Gut, a particularly narrow stretch of the River Kennet. The layout allows space for outdoor tables, and there is granite stadium-style seating. Two bridges have been installed spanning the Kennet—Cooks Bridge, a straight footbridge which links The Riverside Car Park to House of Fraser, and Delphi Bridge, an ellipse bridge giving access from the Vue cinema to Debenhams.

The Free Form Arts Trust were appointed as the arts agency with responsibility for the appointment and contractual arrangements with artists. Specially commissioned artworks include the Crystal Beacon, a reflective translucent prism by Welsh artist John Gingell that tops off the multistory car park.

The overall centre design concept was created by Haskoll & Co., London. They were called in to design a "retail for leisure" concept, linking the site to a heritage trail around the town.

The Oracle also provides two large car parks providing 2300 spaces. In line with other car parks in central Reading, charges are comparatively high, especially for long term parkers.

Awards
In 2002 Reading was named eighth best town centre in the country. In 2007 the Oracle centre was ranked 16th in a league table of best performing retail centres in the UK compiled by economic analyst Experian. In a separate poll carried out by Verdict, Reading was placed 10th in the table of UK shopping destinations.

2000 BCSC award for best new centre
2001 ICSC award for best International Shopping Centre
Secure Car Park award 2000, 2001, 2002, 2003, 2004, 2005, 2006, 2007, 2008, 2009, 2010, 2011, 2012, 2013 and 2014
Loo of the Year Awards 2001 and 2002
2003 BCSC Best Advertising Campaign
2007 BCSC 'Established Centre' Gold Award
ROSPA Gold Award 2007, 2008, 2009, 2010, 2011, 2012, 2013, 2014
Investors in People Award

References in popular culture

YouTuber and amateur pianist Joe Jenkins recorded a video titled 'Playing MEGALOVANIA in a mall until someone asks me to stop'. He lasted just under 2 hours until a security guard approached him and told him to stop.

References

External links 

 
Mall Guide
The Oracle Centre at hammerson.com
Assessing the Impact of Major In-Town Shopping Centres
Public Art Strategy – Free Form

Shopping centres in Berkshire
Buildings and structures in Reading, Berkshire
Shopping malls established in 1999
1999 establishments in England